Pope Gelasius II created only one cardinal in one consistory:

9 March 1118

 , nephew of Paschal II – cardinal-deacon of San Adriano, then cardinal-priest of SS. Silvestro e Martino (9 March 1123), † 1131/32

References

Bibliography

Gelasius II
College of Cardinals
12th-century Catholicism